Čavle is a village and a municipality in the Primorje-Gorski Kotar County in western Croatia.

There are a total of 7,220 inhabitants, in the following settlements:
 Buzdohanj, population 1,517
 Cernik, population 1,397
 Čavle, population 1,358
 Grobnik, population 421
 Ilovik, population 14
 Mavrinci, population 1,021
 Podčudnič, population 470
 Podrvanj, population 461
 Soboli, population 172
 Zastenice, population 389

The population is 87.55% Croats.

References

Municipalities of Croatia
Populated places in Primorje-Gorski Kotar County